Buckinghamshire is a ceremonial county in south-east England. Its county town is Aylesbury, and it is surrounded by Northamptonshire to the north, Bedfordshire and Hertfordshire to the east, Surrey and Berkshire to the south, Greater London to the south-east and Oxfordshire to the west. As of April 2020, the ceremonial county is administered by two unitary authorities, Buckinghamshire Council and Milton Keynes City Council. Buckinghamshire has an area of 1874 km2, and a population of 739,600.

Local nature reserves (LNRs) are designated by local authorities under the National Parks and Access to the Countryside Act 1949. The local authority must have a legal control over the site, by owning or leasing it or having an agreement with the owner. LNRs are sites which have a special local interest either biologically or geologically, and local authorities have a duty to care for them. They can apply local bye-laws to manage and protect LNRs.

As of July 2016 there are sixteen LNRs in Buckinghamshire. Fifteen are in the Buckinghamshire Council area, and one is in the City of Milton Keynes. Two sites are also Sites of Special Scientific Interest and four are in the Chilterns Area of Outstanding Natural Beauty. The largest is Black Park LNR with 65.8 hectares. This is part of the 250 hectare Black Park Country Park and the forty-three square mile Colne Valley regional park. The smallest site is the 0.5 hectare Coombs Quarry, which has geological interest due to a Jurassic layer, and Romano-British archaeology. There is public access to all sites except Buckingham Sand Pit.

Key

Other classifications
BBOWT = Berkshire, Buckinghamshire and Oxfordshire Wildlife Trust
CAONB = Chilterns Area of Outstanding Natural Beauty
CVRP = Colne Valley regional park
NT = National Trust
SM = Scheduled monument
SSSI = Site of Special Scientific Interest

Sites

See also

List of Sites of Special Scientific Interest in Buckinghamshire
List of local nature reserves in England
Berkshire, Buckinghamshire and Oxfordshire Wildlife Trust

Notes

References

 
Buckinghamshire
Buckinghamshire-related lists